The High Sheriff of West Yorkshire is a current High Sheriff title which has existed since 1974, the holder is changed annually every March. For around 1,000 years the entire area of Yorkshire was covered by a single Sheriff of Yorkshire. After the Local Government Act 1972 the office of Sheriff was changed to High Sheriff and was split to cover several newly created counties, including West Yorkshire.

Below is a list of the high sheriffs for West Yorkshire.

List of High Sheriffs

 1974-1975 Sir William Peter Bulmer
 1975-1976 George Francis Lane Fox
 1976-1977 Michael Edmund Lyon
 1977-1978 David Gaunt
 1978-1979 John Malcoln Barr
 1979-1980 Stephen Gerald Beaumont
 1980-1981 Robert German Owthwaite
 1981-1982 Charles Miller Fenton
 1982-1983 David Fearnley
 1983-1984 Elizabeth Mary Whitaker
 1984-1985 Stuart Alan Barr
 1985-1986 John Lyles
 1986-1987 Yvonne Brenda Jackson
 1987-1988 George Cooke Armitage
 1988-1989 John Richard Marshall Roscoe
 1989-1990 Victor Hugo Watson
 1990-1991 Peter John Dixon Marshall
 1991-1992 Israel Arnold Ziff
 1992-1993 David Humphrey Boyle
 1993-1994 Geoffrey Flockton Armitage
 1994-1995 Charles Wilfred David Sutcliffe
 1995-1996 Edward Neil Pullan
 1996-1997 John Stephen Behrens
 1997-1998 Frederick Thomas Benson Jowitt
 1998-1999 John James Edward Brennan
 1999-2000 Peter Arthur Hillard Hartley
 2000-2001 Frank Ramsey Fenton
 2001-2002 John Stoddart-Scott
 2002-2003 John D Jackson
 2003-2004 Patrick Dent
 2004-2005 James Barker 
 2005-2006 Tim Hare
 2006-2007 Roger Frank Dixon Marshall
 2007-2008 Gay Hartley
 2008-2009 Roger G Bowers  
 2009-2010 Jeremy John Burton
 2010-2011 Richard Robert Clough
 2011-2012 Anthony E Grant, OBE
 2012–2013 Stephen R Davidson 
 2013–2014 Virginia A Lloyd
 2014–2015 The Hon Mrs (Charles) Dent of Ribston Hall
 2015–2016 Edmund John Seward Anderson of Thorner, Leeds.
 2016–2017 Christopher John Brown of Sutton-in-Craven, Keighley.
 2017–2018 Dr Terence George Bramall, CBE.
 2018–2019 Charles Richard Jackson, MBE, of Ferrensby, Knaresborough.
 2019–2020 Paul David Lawrence of Harrogate.
 2020–2021 Jonathan Henry Thornton of Huddersfield.
 2021–2022
 2022–2021 Mrs Susan Kitty Baker, MBE 
 2023–2024 Zulfiqar Ali Karim

References

External links
HighSheriffs.com
High Sheriff of West Yorkshire

Local government in West Yorkshire
West Yorkshire
West Yorkshire
High Sheriffs